Park Jun-heong (Hangul: 박준형; Hanja: 朴俊炯; born 25 January 1993) is a South Korean professional footballer who is currently plays for Thai League 1 club Ratchaburi Mitr Phol.

Club career
Park made his professional debut in the Segunda Liga for Académico de Viseu on 17 September 2016 in a game against Desportivo das Aves.

On 27 December 2019, Park joined Hong Kong Premier League club Kitchee.

On 31 May 2022, Park left the club after finishing his contract.

Honours
Kitchee
 Hong Kong Premier League: 2019–20
 Hong Kong Sapling Cup: 2019–20

References

External links

1993 births
Living people
South Korean footballers
South Korean expatriate footballers
Expatriate footballers in Portugal
Atlético Clube de Portugal players
Académico de Viseu F.C. players
Suwon Samsung Bluewings players
Park Jun-heong
Liga Portugal 2 players
K League 1 players
Park Jun-heong
South Korean expatriate sportspeople in Portugal
C.D. Pinhalnovense players
Association football defenders
Hong Kong Premier League players
Expatriate footballers in Hong Kong
South Korean expatriate sportspeople in Hong Kong
Kitchee SC players